Valley Ridge may refer to:

Valley Ridge, Calgary
Valley Ridge, Missouri
Valley Ridge (Winter sports resort) proposed indoor resort in Suffolk, England